Millstream may refer to:

Places 
 Millstream, Queensland, a locality in the Tablelands Region, Queensland, Australia

Millstream, a headstream of the Herbert River, Queensland, Australia
Millstream Falls in Queensland, Australia
Millstream-Chichester National Park, a national park in Western Australia.

Other 
 Millstream Brewing, a small beer brewery located in Amana, Iowa.

 The Millstream, a fictional stream in the World of Greyhawk campaign setting for the Dungeons & Dragons role-playing game.

A leat,  an artificial watercourse or aqueduct dug into the ground, supplying water to a watermill or its mill pond

See also
Mill Stream (disambiguation), similarly named places or objects